The Exo (public transit)  Roussillon sector, provides transportation services for residents in the towns of Delson, Sainte-Catherine, and Saint-Constant in Quebec, Canada. These are suburbs of Montreal located on the south shore of the Saint Lawrence River in the Regional County Municipality of Roussillon.

During the week there are 7 local bus routes with 3 park and ride express routes running to the Terminus Brossard-Panama, the Terminus Centre-Ville as well as to the Angrignon and the Jolicoeur metro stations from the Georges-Gagné parking facility. The local buses also connect to three AMT stations on the Candiac line, for commuter train service into the city. On the weekend only one local route and one of the express routes into Montreal are in operation.
Due to the REM, exo is completely redoing its bus network in this network to redirect buses to the new REM stations, since buses will no longer be able to use the Champlain Bridge. These changes are due to take place in 2021. 
The expired contract for transport services between Transdev Limocar and CIT Roussillon was a 10-year contract that ended on July 15, 2018.

Bus routes

Georges Gagné Park-n-Ride (AMT)

See also
 Exo (public transit) bus services
 List of Agence métropolitaine de transport park and ride lots

References

External links
 History of Conseil Intermunicipal de Transport (CIT)
 AMT website for CIT Roussillon
 AMT page for Georges-Gagné park and ride

Transit agencies in Quebec
Saint-Constant, Quebec
Government agencies established in 1984
1984 establishments in Quebec
Transport in Roussillon Regional County Municipality